Aaron Meijers (born 28 October 1987) is a Dutch professional footballer who plays as a left back for Eredivisie club Sparta Rotterdam. He formerly played for FC Volendam, RKC Waalwijk and ADO Den Haag.

Club career
Meijers was born in Delft. Aged six he moved to Andijk, where he started playing for AVV Andijk (now Sporting Andijk). In 2000 Meijers joined FC Volendam. After four years in the first team of FC Volendam he moved to RKC Waalwijk. With both FC Volendam and RKC Waalwijk Meijers won the Eerste Divisie. In 2012 Meijers went to ADO Den Haag. 

For the 2020–21 season, he was loaned to Sparta Rotterdam. After returning to ADO Den Haag and beginning the 2021–22 season there, on 30 August 2021 he returned to Sparta on a permanent basis.

International career
Meijers, along with fellow ADO player Jens Toornstra was invited to train with the national team in 2012 by Louis van Gaal.

Career statistics

Honours

Club
AVV Andijk
FC Volendam
Eerste Divisie: 2007–08

RKC Waalwijk
Eerste Divisie: 2010–11

References

External links
 
 
 Voetbal International profile 

1987 births
Living people
Footballers from Delft
Association football defenders
Association football midfielders
Dutch footballers
FC Volendam players
RKC Waalwijk players
ADO Den Haag players
Sparta Rotterdam players
Eredivisie players
Eerste Divisie players